

Events

Pre-1600
4 – Augustus adopts Tiberius.
 221 – Roman emperor Elagabalus adopts his cousin Alexander Severus as his heir and receives the title of Caesar.
 363 – Roman emperor Julian is killed during the retreat from the Sasanian Empire. 
 684 – Pope Benedict II is chosen.
 699 – En no Ozuno, a Japanese mystic and apothecary who will later be regarded as the founder of a folk religion Shugendō, is banished to Izu Ōshima.
1243 – Mongols defeat the Seljuk Turks at the Battle of Köse Dağ.
1295 – Przemysł II crowned king of Poland, following Ducal period. The white eagle is added to the Polish coat of arms.
1407 – Ulrich von Jungingen becomes Grand Master of the Teutonic Knights.
1409 – Western Schism: The Roman Catholic Church is led into a double schism as Petros Philargos is crowned Pope Alexander V after the Council of Pisa, joining Pope Gregory XII in Rome and Pope Benedict XIII in Avignon.
1460 – Richard Neville, 16th Earl of Warwick, and Edward, Earl of March, land in England with a rebel army and march on London.
1483 – Richard III becomes King of England.
1522 – Ottomans begin the second Siege of Rhodes.
1541 – Francisco Pizarro is assassinated in Lima by the son of his former companion and later antagonist, Diego de Almagro the younger. Almagro is later caught and executed.
1579 – Livonian campaign of Stephen Báthory begins.

1601–1900
1718 – Alexei Petrovich, Tsarevich of Russia, Peter the Great's son, mysteriously dies after being sentenced to death by his father for plotting against him.
1723 – After a siege and bombardment by cannon, Baku surrenders to the Russians.
1740 – A combined force of Spanish, free blacks and allied Indians defeat a British garrison at the Siege of Fort Mose near St. Augustine during the War of Jenkins' Ear.
1794 – French Revolutionary Wars: Battle of Fleurus marked the first successful military use of aircraft.
1830 – William IV becomes king of Britain and Hanover.
1843 – Treaty of Nanking comes into effect, Hong Kong Island is ceded to the British "in perpetuity".
1848 – End of the June Days Uprising in Paris.
1857 – The first investiture of the Victoria Cross in Hyde Park, London.
1886 – Henri Moissan isolated elemental Fluorine for the first time.
1889 – Bangui is founded by Albert Dolisie and Alfred Uzac in what was then the upper reaches of the French Congo.

1901–present
1906 – The first Grand Prix motor race is held at Le Mans.
1909 – The Science Museum in London comes into existence as an independent entity.
1917 – World War I: The American Expeditionary Forces begin to arrive in France. They will first enter combat four months later.
1918 – World War I: Allied forces under John J. Pershing and James Harbord defeat Imperial German forces under Wilhelm, German Crown Prince in the Battle of Belleau Wood.
1924 – The American occupation of the Dominican Republic ends after eight years.
1927 – The Cyclone roller coaster opens on Coney Island.
1934 – United States President Franklin D. Roosevelt signs the Federal Credit Union Act, which establishes credit unions.
1936 – Initial flight of the Focke-Wulf Fw 61, the first practical helicopter.
1940 – World War II: Under the Molotov–Ribbentrop Pact, the Soviet Union presents an ultimatum to Romania requiring it to cede Bessarabia and the northern part of Bukovina.
1941 – World War II: Soviet planes bomb Kassa, Hungary (now Košice, Slovakia), giving Hungary the impetus to declare war the next day.
1942 – The first flight of the Grumman F6F Hellcat.
1944 – World War II: San Marino, a neutral state, is mistakenly bombed by the RAF based on faulty information, leading to 35 civilian deaths. 
  1944   – World War II: The Battle of Osuchy in Osuchy, Poland, one of the largest battles between Nazi Germany and Polish resistance forces, ends with the defeat of the latter.
1945 – The United Nations Charter is signed by 50 Allied nations in San Francisco, California.
1948 – Cold War: The first supply flights are made in response to the Berlin Blockade.
  1948   – William Shockley files the original patent for the grown-junction transistor, the first bipolar junction transistor.
  1948   – Shirley Jackson's short story The Lottery is published in The New Yorker magazine.
1952 – The Pan-Malayan Labour Party is founded in Malaya, as a union of statewide labour parties.
1953 – Lavrentiy Beria, head of MVD, is arrested by Nikita Khrushchev and other members of the Politburo.
1955 – The South African Congress Alliance adopts the Freedom Charter at the Congress of the People in Kliptown.
1959 – Swedish boxer Ingemar Johansson becomes world champion of heavy weight boxing, by defeating American Floyd Patterson on technical knockout after two minutes and three seconds in the third round at Yankee Stadium.
1960 – The former British Protectorate of British Somaliland gains its independence as Somaliland. 
  1960   – Madagascar gains its independence from France.
1963 – Cold War: U.S. President John F. Kennedy gave his "Ich bin ein Berliner" speech, underlining the support of the United States for democratic West Germany shortly after Soviet-supported East Germany erected the Berlin Wall.
1967 – Karol Wojtyła (later John Paul II) made a cardinal by Pope Paul VI.
1974 – The Universal Product Code is scanned for the first time to sell a package of Wrigley's chewing gum at the Marsh Supermarket in Troy, Ohio.
1975 – Two FBI agents and a member of the American Indian Movement are killed in a shootout on the Pine Ridge Indian Reservation in South Dakota; Leonard Peltier is later convicted of the murders in a controversial trial.
1977 – Elvis Presley held his final concert in Indianapolis, Indiana at Market Square Arena.
1978 – Air Canada Flight 189, flying to Toronto, overruns the runway and crashes into the Etobicoke Creek ravine. Two of the 107 passengers on board perish.
1981 – Dan-Air Flight 240, flying to East Midlands Airport, crashes in Nailstone, Leicestershire. All three crew members perish.
1988 – The first crash of an Airbus A320 occurs when Air France Flight 296Q crashes at Mulhouse–Habsheim Airfield in Habsheim, France, during an air show, killing three of the 136 people on board.
1991 – Yugoslav Wars: The Yugoslav People's Army begins the Ten-Day War in Slovenia.
1995 – Hamad bin Khalifa Al Thani deposes his father Khalifa bin Hamad Al Thani, the Emir of Qatar, in a bloodless coup d'état.
1997 – The U.S. Supreme Court rules that the Communications Decency Act violates the First Amendment to the United States Constitution.
  1997   – J. K. Rowling publishes the first of her Harry Potter novel series, Harry Potter and the Philosopher's Stone in United Kingdom.
2000 – The Human Genome Project announces the completion of a "rough draft" sequence.
2003 – The U.S. Supreme Court rules in Lawrence v. Texas that gender-based sodomy laws are unconstitutional.
2006 – Mari Alkatiri, the first Prime Minister of East Timor, resigns after weeks of political unrest.
2007 – Pope Benedict XVI reinstates the traditional laws of papal election in which a successful candidate must receive two-thirds of the votes.
2008 – A suicide bomber dressed as an Iraqi policeman detonates an explosive vest, killing 25 people.
2012 – The Waldo Canyon fire descends into the Mountain Shadows neighborhood in Colorado Springs burning 347 homes in a matter of hours and killing two people.
2013 – Riots in China's Xinjiang region kill at least 36 people and injure 21 others.
  2013   – The U.S. Supreme Court ruled, 5–4, that Section 3 of the Defense of Marriage Act is unconstitutional and in violation of the Fifth Amendment to the United States Constitution.
2015 – Five different terrorist attacks in France, Tunisia, Somalia, Kuwait, and Syria occurred on what was dubbed Bloody Friday by international media. Upwards of 750 people were either killed or injured in these uncoordinated attacks.
  2015   – The U.S. Supreme Court ruled, 5–4, that same-sex couples have a constitutional right to marriage under the 14th Amendment to the United States Constitution.

Births

Pre-1600
12 BC – Agrippa Postumus, Roman son of Marcus Vipsanius Agrippa and Julia the Elder (d. 14)
1399 – John, Count of Angoulême (d. 1467)
1575 – Anne Catherine of Brandenburg (d. 1612)
1581 – San Pedro Claver, Spanish Jesuit saint (d. 1654)
1600 – Juan de Palafox y Mendoza, Spanish-born bishop and viceroy of New Spain (d. 1659)

1601–1900
1681 – Hedvig Sophia of Sweden (d. 1708)
1689 – Edward Holyoke, American pastor and academic (d. 1769)
1694 – Georg Brandt, Swedish chemist and mineralogist (d. 1768)
1699 – Marie Thérèse Rodet Geoffrin, French businesswoman (d. 1777) 
1702 – Philip Doddridge, English hymn-writer and educator (d. 1751)
1703 – Thomas Clap, American minister and academic (d. 1767)
1726 – Victor Amadeus III of Sardinia (d. 1796)
1730 – Charles Messier, French astronomer and academic (d. 1817)
1764 – Jan Paweł Łuszczewski, Polish politician (d. 1812)
1786 – Sunthorn Phu, Thai poet (d. 1855)
1796 – Jan Paweł Lelewel, Polish painter and engineer (d. 1847)
1798 – Wolfgang Menzel, German poet and critic (d. 1873)
1817 – Branwell Brontë, English painter and poet (d. 1848)
1819 – Abner Doubleday, American general (d. 1893)
1821 – Bartolomé Mitre, Argentinian soldier, journalist, and politician, 6th President of Argentina (d. 1906)
1824 – William Thomson, 1st Baron Kelvin, Irish-Scottish physicist and engineer (d. 1907)
1835 – Thomas W. Knox, American journalist and author (d. 1896)
1839 – Sam Watkins, American soldier and author (d. 1901)
1852 – Daoud Corm, Lebanese painter (d. 1930)
1854 – Robert Laird Borden, Canadian lawyer and politician, 8th Prime Minister of Canada (d. 1937)
1865 – Bernard Berenson, Lithuanian-American historian and author (d. 1959)
1866 – George Herbert, 5th Earl of Carnarvon, English archaeologist and banker (d. 1923)
1869 – Martin Andersen Nexø, Danish journalist and author (d. 1954)
1878 – Leopold Löwenheim, German mathematician and logician (d. 1957)
1880 – Mitchell Lewis, American actor (d. 1956)
1881 – Ya'akov Cohen, Israeli linguist, poet, and playwright (d. 1960)
1892 – Pearl S. Buck, American novelist, essayist, short story writer Nobel Prize laureate (d. 1973)
1893 – Dorothy Fuldheim, American journalist and news anchor(d. 1989)
1895 – George Hainsworth, Canadian ice hockey player and politician (d. 1950)
1898 – Willy Messerschmitt, German engineer and businessman (d. 1978)
  1898   – Chesty Puller, US general (d. 1971)
1899 – Grand Duchess Maria Nikolaevna of Russia (d. 1918)

1901–present
1901 – Stuart Symington, American lieutenant and politician, 1st United States Secretary of the Air Force (d. 1988)
1902 – Hugues Cuénod, Swiss tenor and educator (d. 2010)
1903 – Big Bill Broonzy, American singer-songwriter and guitarist (d. 1958)
1904 – Peter Lorre, Slovak-American actor and singer (d. 1964)
1905 – Lynd Ward, American author and illustrator (d. 1985)
1906 – Alberto Rabagliati, Italian singer (d. 1974)
  1906   – Viktor Schreckengost, American sculptor and educator (d. 2008)
1907 – Debs Garms, American baseball player (d. 1984)
1908 – Salvador Allende, Chilean physician and politician, 29th President of Chile (d. 1973)
1909 – Colonel Tom Parker, Dutch-American talent manager (d. 1997)
  1909   – Wolfgang Reitherman, German-American animator, director, and producer (d. 1985)
1911 – Babe Didrikson Zaharias, American golfer and basketball player (d. 1956)
  1911   – Bronisław Żurakowski, Polish pilot and engineer (d. 2009)
1913 – Aimé Césaire, French poet, author, and politician (d. 2008)
  1913   – Maurice Wilkes, English computer scientist and physicist (d. 2010)
1914 – Laurie Lee, English author and poet (d. 1997)
  1914   – Sultan Ahmad Nanupuri, Bangladeshi Islamic scholar and teacher (d. 1997)
  1914   – Princess Sophie of Greece and Denmark, European royalty (d. 2001)
1915 – Paul Castellano, American gangster (d. 1985)
  1915   – George Haigh, English professional footballer (d. 2019)
  1915   – Charlotte Zolotow, American author and poet (d. 2013)
1916 – Virginia Satir, American psychotherapist and author (d. 1988)
  1916   – Giuseppe Taddei, Italian actor and singer (d. 2010)
1917 – Idriz Ajeti, Albanian albanologist (d. 2019)
1918 – Leo Rosner, Polish-born Austrian Jewish musician (d. 2008)
  1918   – Raleigh Rhodes, American combat fighter pilot (d. 2007)
  1918   – J. B. Fuqua, American entrepreneur and philanthropist (d. 2006)
1919 – Richard Neustadt, American political scientist and academic (d. 2003)
  1919   – Jimmy Newberry, American pitcher (d. 1983)
  1919   – George Athan Billias, American historian (d. 2018)
  1919   – Donald M. Ashton, English art director (d. 2004)
1920 – Jean-Pierre Roy, Canadian-American baseball player, manager, and sportscaster (d. 2014)
1921 – Violette Szabo, French-British secret agent (d. 1945)
  1921   – Robert Everett, American computer scientist (d. 2018)
1922 – Walter Farley, American author (d. 1989)
  1922   – Eleanor Parker, American actress (d. 2013)
  1922   – Enzo Apicella, English artist, cartoonist, designer, and restaurateur (d. 2018)
1923 – Franz-Paul Decker, German conductor (d. 2014)
  1923   – Ed Bearss, American military historian and author (d. 2020)
1924 – Kostas Axelos, Greek-French philosopher and author (d. 2010)
  1924   – James W. McCord Jr., CIA officer (d. 2017)
1925 – Pavel Belyayev, Soviet soldier, pilot and cosmonaut (d. 1970)
  1925   – Wolfgang Unzicker, German chess player (d. 2006)
  1925   – Jean Frydman, French resistant and businessman (d. 2021)
1926 – Kenny Baker, American fiddler (d. 2011)
  1926   – Mahendra Bhatnagar, Indian poet (d. 2020)
  1926   – Fernando Mönckeberg Barros, Chilean surgeon
  1926   – Dinu Zamfirescu, Romanian politician
1927 – Robert Kroetsch, Canadian author and poet (d. 2011)
1928 – Jacob Druckman, American composer and academic (d. 1996)
  1928   – Yoshiro Nakamatsu, Japanese inventor
  1928   – Bill Sheffield, American politician; 5th Governor of Alaska
  1928   – Samuel Belzberg, Canadian businessman and philanthropist (d. 2018)
1929 – June Bronhill, Australian soprano and actress (d. 2005)
  1929   – Fred Bruemmer, Latvian-Canadian photographer and author (d. 2013)
  1929   – Milton Glaser, American illustrator and graphic designer (d. 2020)
1930 – Jackie Fargo, American wrestler and trainer (d. 2013)
  1930   – Wolfgang Schwanitz, East German secret police (d. 2022)
1931 – Colin Wilson, English philosopher and author (d. 2013)
1932 – Dame Marguerite Pindling, Bahamian politician; Governor-General of the Bahamas
  1932   – Don Valentine, American venture capitalist (d. 2019)
1933 – Claudio Abbado, Italian conductor (d. 2014)
  1933   – Gene Green, American baseball player (d. 1981)
  1933   – David Winnick, English politician
1934 – Dave Grusin, American pianist and composer
  1934   – Toru Goto, Japanese swimmer
1935 – Carlo Facetti, Italian race car driver
  1935   – Sandro Riminucci, Italian basketball player
1936 – Benjamin Adekunle, Nigerian general (d. 2014)
  1936   – Hal Greer, American basketball player (d. 2018)
  1936   – Robert Maclennan, Baron Maclennan of Rogart, Scottish politician (d. 2020)
  1936   – Edith Pearlman, American short story writer
  1936   – Jean-Claude Turcotte, Canadian cardinal (d. 2015)
  1936   – Nancy Willard, American author and poet (d. 2017)
1937 – Robert Coleman Richardson, American physicist and academic, Nobel Prize laureate (d. 2013)
  1937   – Reggie Workman, American bassist and composer 
1938 – Neil Abercrombie, American sociologist and politician, 7th Governor of Hawaii
  1938   – Billy Davis Jr., American pop-soul singer 
  1938   – Gerald North, American climatologist and academic
1939 – Chuck Robb, American soldier, lawyer, and politician, 64th Governor of Virginia
  1939   – Zainuddin Maidin, Malaysian politician (d. 2018)
1941 – Yves Beauchemin, Canadian author and academic
1942 – J. J. Dillon, American wrestler and manager
  1942   – Gilberto Gil, Brazilian singer-songwriter, guitarist, and politician, Brazilian Minister of Culture
1943 – Georgie Fame, English singer, pianist, and keyboard player
  1943   – Warren Farrell, American author and educator
1944 – Gennady Zyuganov, Russian politician
  1945   – Dwight York, American singer
1946 – Candace Pert, American neuroscientist and pharmacologist (d. 2013)
1949 – Fredric Brandt, American dermatologist and author (d. 2015)
  1949   – Adrian Gurvitz, English singer-songwriter and producer 
  1949   – Mary Styles Harris, American biologist and geneticist
1951 – Gary Gilmour, Australian cricketer and manager (d. 2014)
1952 – Gordon McQueen, Scottish footballer and manager
  1952   – Olive Morris, Jamaican-English civil rights activist (d. 1979)
1954 – Luis Arconada, Spanish footballer 
1955 – Mick Jones, English singer-songwriter and guitarist 
  1955   – Gedde Watanabe, American actor
1956 – Chris Isaak, American singer-songwriter, guitarist, and actor
  1956   – Catherine Samba-Panza, interim president of the Central African Republic
  1956   – Patrick Mercer, English colonel and politician
1957 – Al Hunter Ashton, English actor and screenwriter (d. 2007)
  1957   – Philippe Couillard, Canadian surgeon and politician, 31st Premier of Quebec
  1957   – Patty Smyth, American singer-songwriter and musician
1959 – Mark McKinney, Canadian actor and screenwriter
1960 – Mark Durkan, Irish politician
1961 – Greg LeMond, American cyclist
  1961   – Terri Nunn, American singer-songwriter and actress 
1962 – Jerome Kersey, American basketball player and coach (d. 2015)
1963 – Mikhail Khodorkovsky, Russian-Swiss businessman and philanthropist
  1963   – Mark McClellan, American economist and politician
  1963   – Harriet Wheeler, English singer-songwriter 
1964 – Tommi Mäkinen, Finnish race car driver
1966 – Dany Boon, French actor, director, and screenwriter
  1966   – Kirk McLean, Canadian ice hockey player
  1966   – Jürgen Reil, American drummer 
1967 – Inha Babakova, Ukrainian high jumper
  1967   – Olivier Dahan, French director and screenwriter
1968 – Guðni Th. Jóhannesson, Icelandic lecturer and politician, 6th President of Iceland
  1968   – Paolo Maldini, Italian footballer
  1968   – Shannon Sharpe, American football player
1969 – Colin Greenwood, English bass player and songwriter 
  1969   – Ingrid Lempereur, Belgian swimmer
  1969   – Geir Moen, Norwegian sprinter
  1969   – Mike Myers, American baseball player
1970 – Paul Thomas Anderson, American director, producer, and screenwriter
  1970   – Paul Bitok, Kenyan runner
  1970   – Irv Gotti, American record producer, co-founded Murder Inc Records
  1970   – Sean Hayes, American actor
  1970   – Matt Letscher, American actor and playwright
  1970   – Adam Ndlovu, Zimbabwean footballer (d. 2012)
  1970   – Chris O'Donnell, American actor 
  1970   – Nick Offerman, American actor
1971 – Max Biaggi, Italian motorcycle racer
1972 – Jai Taurima, Australian long jumper and police officer
1973 – Gretchen Wilson, American singer-songwriter and guitarist 
1974 – Derek Jeter, American baseball player
  1974   – Jason Kendall, American baseball player
1975 – Chris Armstrong, Canadian ice hockey player
  1975   – Terry Skiverton, English footballer and manager
1976 – Ed Jovanovski, Canadian ice hockey player
  1976   – Pommie Mbangwa, Zimbabwean cricketer and sportscaster
  1976   – Chad Pennington, American football player and sportscaster
  1976   – Dave Rubin, American political commentator
1977 – Quincy Lewis, American basketball player
1979 – Ryō Fukuda, Japanese race car driver
  1979   – Walter Herrmann, Argentinian basketball player
  1979   – Ryan Tedder, American singer-songwriter, pianist, and producer 
1980 – Hamílton Hênio Ferreira Calheiros, Togolese footballer
  1980   – Michael Jackson, English footballer
  1980   – Jason Schwartzman, American singer-songwriter, drummer, and actor
  1980   – Chris Shelton, American baseball player
  1980   – Michael Vick, American football player
1981 – Natalya Antyukh, Russian sprinter and hurdler
  1981   – Paolo Cannavaro, Italian footballer
  1981   – Kanako Kondō, Japanese voice actress and singer
  1981   – Takashi Toritani, Japanese baseball player
1982 – Zuzana Kučová, Slovak tennis player
1983 – Vinícius Rodrigues Almeida, Brazilian footballer
  1983   – Nick Compton, South African-English cricketer
  1983   – Toyonoshima Daiki, Japanese sumo wrestler
  1983   – Felipe Melo, Brazilian footballer
  1983   – Antonio Rosati, Italian footballer
1984 – Indila, French singer
  1984   – José Juan Barea, Puerto Rican-American basketball player
  1984   – Yankuba Ceesay, Gambian footballer
  1984   – Elijah Dukes, American baseball player
  1984   – Raymond Felton, American basketball player
  1984   – Priscah Jeptoo, Kenyan runner
  1984   – Jūlija Tepliha, Latvian figure skater
  1984   – Deron Williams, American basketball player
  1984   – Preslava, Bulgarian singer
1985 – Ogyen Trinley Dorje, Tibetan spiritual leader, 17th Karmapa Lama
1986 – Duvier Riascos, Colombian footballer
1987 – Carlos Iaconelli, Brazilian race car driver
  1987   – Samir Nasri, French footballer
1988 – Oliver Stang, German footballer
  1988   – Andrew Bachelor, Canadian-American actor, comedian, director, producer, writer and social media personality
1990 – Belaynesh Oljira, Ethiopian runner
  1990   – Igor Subbotin, Estonian footballer
1991 – Houssem Chemali, French footballer
  1991   – Diego Falcinelli, Italian footballer
  1991   – Dustin Martin, Australian rules footballer
1992 – Joel Campbell, Costa Rican footballer
  1992   – Rudy Gobert, French basketball player
  1992   – Jennette McCurdy, American actress and singer-songwriter
1993 – Ariana Grande, American singer-songwriter, dancer, and actress
1994 – Hollie Arnold, English javelin thrower
  1994   – Leonard Carow, German actor
1997 – Baek Ye-rin, South Korean singer
  1997   – Callum Taylor, English cricketer
2000 – Ann Li, American tennis player
2002 – Chandler Smith, American racing driver
2005 – Princess Alexia of the Netherlands
2009 – Yesha Camile, Filipino child actress

Deaths

Pre-1600
116 BC – Ptolemy VIII, king of Egypt 
 363 – Julian the Apostate, Roman emperor (b. 332)
 405 – Vigilius, bishop of Trent (b. 353)
 822 – Saichō, Japanese Buddhist monk (b. 767) 
 969 – George El Mozahem, Egyptian martyr (b. 940)
 985 – Ramiro III, king of León 
1090 – Jaromír, bishop of Prague
1095 – Robert, bishop of Hereford
1265 – Anne of Bohemia, duchess of Silesia (b. 1203 or 1204)
1274 – Nasir al-Din al-Tusi, Persian scientist and writer (b. 1201)
1487 – John Argyropoulos, Byzantine philosopher and scholar (b. 1415)
1541 – Francisco Pizarro, Spanish explorer and politician, Governor of New Castile (b. c. 1471)
1574 – Gabriel, comte de Montgomery, captain of the Scottish Guard of Henry II of France (b. 1530)

1601–1900
1677 – Francesco Buonamici, Italian architect, painter and engraver (b. 1596)
1688 – Ralph Cudworth, English philosopher and academic (b. 1617)
1752 – Giulio Alberoni, Spanish cardinal (b. 1664)
1757 – Maximilian Ulysses Browne, Austrian field marshal (b. 1705)
1784 – Caesar Rodney, American lawyer and politician, 4th Governor of Delaware (b. 1728)
1793 – Gilbert White, English ornithologist and ecologist (b. 1720)
1795 – Johannes Jährig, German linguist and translator (b. 1747)
1798 – James Dickey, Irish revolutionary (b. 1776)
1808 – Ludwik Tyszkiewicz, Polish poet and politician (b. 1748)
1810 – Joseph-Michel Montgolfier, French inventor, co-invented the hot air balloon (b. 1740)
1830 – George IV of the United Kingdom (b. 1762)
1836 – Claude Joseph Rouget de Lisle, French soldier and composer (b. 1760)
1856 – Max Stirner, German philosopher and author (b. 1806)
1870 – Armand Barbès, French lawyer and politician (b. 1809)
1878 – Mercedes of Orléans (b. 1860)
1879 – Richard H. Anderson, American general (b. 1821)
1883 – Edward Sabine, Irish-English astronomer, geophysicist, and ornithologist (b. 1788)

1901–present
1918 – Peter Rosegger, Austrian poet and author (b. 1843)
1922 – Albert I, Prince of Monaco (b. 1848)
1927 – Armand Guillaumin, French painter (b. 1841)
1932 – Adelaide Ames, American astronomer and academic (b. 1900)
1938 – James Weldon Johnson, American poet, lawyer and politician (b. 1871)
  1938   – Daria Pratt, American golfer (b. 1859)
1939 – Ford Madox Ford, English novelist, poet, and critic (b. 1873)
1943 – Karl Landsteiner, Austrian biologist and physician, Nobel Prize laureate (b. 1868)
1945 – Emil Hácha, Czech lawyer and politician, 3rd President of Czechoslovakia (b. 1872)
1946 – Max Kögel, German SS officer (b. 1895)
  1946   – Yōsuke Matsuoka, Japanese politician, Japanese Minister of Foreign Affairs (b. 1880)
1947 – R. B. Bennett, Canadian lawyer and politician, 11th Prime Minister of Canada (b. 1870)
1949 – Kim Koo, South Korean educator and politician, 13th President of the Provisional Government of the Republic of Korea (b. 1876)
1955 – Engelbert Zaschka, German engineer (b. 1895)
1956 – Clifford Brown, American trumpet player and composer (b. 1930)
  1956   – Richie Powell, American pianist (b. 1931)
1957 – Alfred Döblin, Polish-German physician and author (b. 1878)
  1957   – Malcolm Lowry, English novelist and poet (b. 1909)
1958 – George Orton, Canadian runner and hurdler (b. 1873)
  1958   – Andrija Štampar, Croatian physician and scholar (b. 1888)
1964 – Léo Dandurand, American-Canadian businessman (b. 1889)
1967 – Françoise Dorléac, French actress and singer (b. 1942)
1975 – Josemaría Escrivá, Spanish priest and saint (b. 1902)
1979 – Akwasi Afrifa, Ghanaian soldier and politician, 3rd Head of State of Ghana (b. 1936)
1989 – Howard Charles Green, Canadian lawyer and politician, 27th Canadian Minister of Public Works (b. 1895)
1990 – Anni Blomqvist, Finnish author (b. 1909)
1992 – Buddy Rogers, American wrestler (b. 1921)
1993 – Roy Campanella, American baseball player and coach (b. 1921)
  1993   – William H. Riker, American political scientist and academic (b. 1920)
1994 – Jahanara Imam, Bangladeshi author and activist (b. 1929)
1996 – Veronica Guerin, Irish journalist (b. 1958)
  1996   – Necmettin Hacıeminoğlu, Turkish linguist and academic (b. 1932)
1997 – Don Hutson, American football player and coach (b. 1913)
1998 – Hacı Sabancı, Turkish businessman and philanthropist (b. 1935)
2002 – Jay Berwanger, American football player (b. 1914)
  2002   – Arnold Brown, English-Canadian 11th General of The Salvation Army (b. 1913)
2003 – Marc-Vivien Foé, Cameroon footballer (b. 1975)
  2003   – Denis Thatcher, English soldier and businessman (b. 1915)
  2003   – Strom Thurmond, American general, lawyer, and politician, 103rd Governor of South Carolina (b. 1902)
2004 – Ott Arder, Estonian poet and translator (b. 1950)
  2004   – Yash Johar, Indian film producer, founded Dharma Productions (b. 1929)
  2004   – Naomi Shemer, Israeli singer-songwriter (b. 1930)
2005 – Tõnno Lepmets, Estonian basketball player (b. 1938)
  2005   – Richard Whiteley, English journalist and game show host (b. 1943)
2006 – Tommy Wonder, Dutch magician (b. 1953)
2007 – Liz Claiborne, Belgian-American fashion designer, founded Liz Claiborne (b. 1929)
  2007   – Joey Sadler, New Zealand rugby player (b. 1914)
2010 – Algirdas Brazauskas, Lithuanian engineer and politician, 2nd President of Lithuania (b. 1932)
  2010   – Harald Keres, Estonian physicist and academic (b. 1912)
2011 – Edith Fellows, American actress (b. 1923)
  2011   – Jan van Beveren, Dutch footballer and coach (b. 1948)
2012 – Sverker Åström, Swedish diplomat, Swedish Permanent Representative to the United Nations (b. 1915)
  2012   – Pat Cummings, American basketball player (b. 1956)
  2012   – Nora Ephron, American director, producer, and screenwriter (b. 1941)
  2012   – Mario O'Hara, Filipino director, producer, and screenwriter (b. 1944) 
  2012   – Doris Singleton, American actress (b. 1919)
2013 – Henrik Otto Donner, Finnish trumpet player and composer (b. 1939)
  2013   – Edward Huggins Johnstone, Brazilian-American sergeant and judge (b. 1922)
  2013   – Byron Looper, American politician (b. 1964)
  2013   – Justin Miller, American baseball player (b. 1977)
  2013   – Marc Rich, Belgian-American businessman (b. 1934)
2014 – Howard Baker, American lawyer, politician, and diplomat, 12th White House Chief of Staff (b. 1925)
  2014   – Bill Frank, American-Canadian football player (b. 1938)
  2014   – Rollin King, American businessman, co-founded Southwest Airlines (b. 1931)
  2014   – Bob Mischak, American football player and coach (b. 1932)
  2014   – Julius Rudel, Austrian-American conductor (b. 1921)
  2014   – Mary Rodgers, American composer and author (b. 1931)
2015 – Yevgeny Primakov, Ukrainian-Russian journalist and politician, 32nd Prime Minister of Russia (b. 1929)
  2015   – Chris Thompson, American screenwriter and producer (b. 1952)
2019 – Beth Chapman, American reality Television star, Bounty Hunter (b. 1967)
2020 – Milton Glaser, American graphic designer (b. 1929)
2021 – Mike Gravel, American politician (b. 1930)
2022 – Margaret Keane, American artist (b. 1927)

Holidays and observances
Day of the Armed Forces of Azerbaijan
Christian feast day:
Anthelm of Belley
David the Dendrite
Hermogius
Isabel Florence Hapgood (Episcopal Church)
Jeremiah (Lutheran)
John and Paul
José María Robles Hurtado (one of Saints of the Cristero War)
Josemaría Escrivá
Mar Abhai (Syriac Orthodox Church)
Pelagius of Córdoba
Vigilius of Trent 
June 26 (Eastern Orthodox liturgics)
Flag Day (Romania)
Independence Day, celebrates the independence of Madagascar from France in 1960. (Madagascar)
Independence Day, celebrates the independence of Somaliland from United Kingdom in 1960. (Somaliland)
International Day against Drug Abuse and Illicit Trafficking (International)
International Day in Support of Victims of Torture (International)
Ratcatcher's Day (Hamelin, Germany)
Sunthorn Phu Day (Thailand)
World Refrigeration Day (International)

References

External links

 
 
 

Days of the year
June